András Parti is a Hungarian cross-country mountain biker. At the 2012 Summer Olympics, he competed in the Men's cross-country at Hadleigh Farm, but did not finish.  He had finished in 23rd in the same event at the 2008 Summer Olympics. He was on the start list for the 2018 Cross-country European Championship and he finished

References

External links

Hungarian male cyclists
Cross-country mountain bikers
Living people
Olympic cyclists of Hungary
Cyclists at the 2008 Summer Olympics
Cyclists at the 2012 Summer Olympics
Cyclists at the 2016 Summer Olympics
1982 births
Cyclists at the 2020 Summer Olympics